is a district in Kōtō, Japan.

Education
Koto Ward Board of Education operates public elementary and junior high schools.

Edogawa Elementary School ( 枝川小学校) is the zoned public elementary school for Shiomi.

Fukagawa No. 8 Junior High School (深川第八中学校) is the zoned junior high school for Shiomi.

References

Districts of Kōtō